Tobias Kühne (born 2 May 1977) is a German rower. He competed in the men's coxless pair event at the 2004 Summer Olympics.

References

External links
 

1977 births
Living people
German male rowers
Olympic rowers of Germany
Rowers at the 2004 Summer Olympics
Sportspeople from Hanover